Serguyaz is a rural locality (a village) in Novonadezhdinsky Selsoviet, Blagoveshchensky District, Bashkortostan, Russia. The population was 1 as of 2010. There is 1 street.

Geography 
Serguyaz is located 31 km northeast of Blagoveshchensk (the district's administrative centre) by road. Yazykovo is the nearest rural locality.

References 

Rural localities in Blagoveshchensky District